The 2001–02 Rugby Pro D2 season was the 2001–02 second division of French club rugby union. There is promotion and relegation in Pro Rugby D2, and after the 2001–02 season, Stade Montois and FC Grenoble were promoted to the top level, and US Tours and FCS Rumilly were relegated to third division.

Standings

See also
 Rugby union in France

External links
 LNR.fr
 Table

2001–02
Pro D2